Gustavo Ruiz Díaz (born September 29, 1981 in Concordia) is an Argentine footballer who currently plays for Brown de Adrogué.

Career

He started and played most of his playing for Club Atlético Los Andes in the lower divisions of Argentine football. He became one of the most important members of his team, so much that he was named captain of the squad for his last two seasons. In April 2008 Ruiz Díaz was signed by Ecuadorian giants Emelec on a one-year contract. In 2009, Diaz was signed by Club Comunicaciones.

References
 Gustavo Ruiz Díaz at BDFA.com.ar 

1981 births
Living people
People from Concordia, Entre Ríos
Sportspeople from Entre Ríos Province
Association football midfielders
Expatriate footballers in Ecuador
Club Atlético Los Andes footballers
C.S. Emelec footballers
Club Atlético Brown footballers
Argentine footballers